The 2015–16 Dallas Stars season was the 49th season for the National Hockey League franchise that was established on June 5, 1967, and 23rd season since the franchise relocated from Minnesota prior to the start of the 1993–94 NHL season.

Standings

Schedule and results

Pre-season

Regular season

Playoffs

Player statistics
Final stats

Skaters

Goaltenders

†Denotes player spent time with another team before joining the Stars.  Stats reflect time with the Stars only.
‡Traded mid-season
Bold/italics denotes franchise record

Suspensions/fines

Awards and honors

Awards

Milestones

Transactions 
The Stars have been involved in the following transactions during the 2015–16 season:

Trades

Free agents acquired

Free agents lost

Claimed via waivers

Lost via waivers

Lost via retirement

Player signings

Draft picks

Below are the Dallas Stars' selections at the 2015 NHL Entry Draft, to be held on June 26–27, 2015 at the BB&T Center in Sunrise, Florida.

Draft notes

 The Dallas Stars' second-round pick went to the New Jersey Devils as the result of a trade on June 27, 2015 that sent a second-round pick in 2015 (36th overall) to Ottawa in exchange for a conditional fourth-round pick in 2015 or 2016 and this pick. Ottawa previously acquired this pick as the result of a trade on July 1, 2014 that sent Jason Spezza and Ludwig Karlsson to the Stars in exchange for Alex Chiasson, Nick Paul, Alex Guptill and this pick.
 The Detroit Red Wings' second-round pick went to the Dallas Stars as the result of a trade on March 1, 2015 that sent Erik Cole and a conditional third-round pick in 2015 to Detroit in exchange for Mattias Janmark, Mattias Backman and this pick.
 The Dallas Stars' third-round pick went to the Detroit Red Wings as the result of a trade on  March 1, 2015 that sent Mattias Janmark, Mattias Backman, and a second-round pick in 2015 to Dallas in exchange for Erik Cole and this pick (being conditional at the time of the trade). The condition – Detroit will receive a third-round pick in 2015 if they do not qualify for the 2015 Eastern Conference Final and Cole does not play in 50% of Detroit's playoff games – was converted on April 8, 2015 when Cole  was injured for the remainder of the season.
 The Dallas Stars' seventh-round pick went to the San Jose Sharks as the result of a trade on June 27, 2015 that sent Antti Niemi to Dallas in exchange for this pick.

References

Dallas Stars seasons
Dallas Stars season, 2015-16
Dallas Stars
Dallas Stars
2010s in Dallas
2015 in Texas
2016 in Texas